Lovely Horribly is a South Korean television series starring Park Si-hoo and Song Ji-hyo with Lee Gi-kwang, Hahm Eun-jung and Choi Yeo-jin. It aired on KBS2 from August 13 to October 2, 2018, every Monday and Tuesday at 22:00 (KST).

Synopsis
Philip (Park Si-hoo) and Eul-soon (Song Ji-hyo) are bound by an unusual fate: one's happiness always results in the other's misfortune. The two start writing a drama together, and the events in the screenplay mysteriously begin occurring in real life.

Cast

Main 

 Park Si-hoo as Yoo Philip/Yoo Eul-chook
 Kim Tae-yool as child Yoo Philip

 A top star who has extraordinary luck and is successful at everything he does.

 Song Ji-hyo as Oh Eul-soon
 Shin Rin-ah as child Eul-soon

 A prophetic screenwriter who is down on her luck.

 Lee Gi-kwang as Lee Sung-joong

 A rookie production director who can see ghosts. He has a crush on Eul-soon.

 Hahm Eun-jung as Shin Yoon-ah

 A popular actress who is Philip's girlfriend.

 Choi Yeo-jin as Ki Eun-young

 A best-selling script writer who stole the work of her best friend Eul-soon. She hates Eul-soon as she is better than her when it comes to writing which created jealousy and hatred towards Eul-soon.

Supporting

People around Phillip
Jang Hyuk-jin as Kang Tae-sik
 CEO of Phillip's agency 
An Doo-ho as Kim Young-man
 Manager of Phillip
Hwang Sun-hee as Kim Ra-yun
 Ex-girlfriend and fiancee of Phillip
Jang Young-nam as Kim Ok-hee
 Phillip's mother
Sung Doo-sub as Seo Min-joon  
Jung Soon-won as Choong Yeol 
Lee Kyu-bok as Ki-soon 
 Ji Seung-hyun as Sa Dong-cheol
Phillip's rival.

People around Eul-soon
 Moo Soo-bin as Park Soo-min 
Eul-soon's assistant and friend. 
Jeon Bae-soo as Eul-soon's father 
Jung Jae-eun as Eul-soon's mother

Others
Kim Young-woong as Detective Lee 
Ryu Tae-ho as Director Jo 
Kim Eung-soo as Fortune teller 
Kim Ji-eun as Lee Soo-jeong 
Song Young-hak 
Kang Suk-won 
Ji Soo 
Choi Hee-jin

Special appearance
 Ha Dong-hoon as Eul-soon's ex-boyfriend
 Hong Seok-cheon as Kang Hyun-Seok
 Goo Jae-yee as fake ghost

Production
The first script reading was held on June 2, 2018, at KBS Annex Broadcasting Station in Yeouido, Seoul.

Original soundtrack

OST Part 1

OST Part 2

OST Part 3

OST Part 4

OST Part 5

OST Part 6

Ratings
 In this table,  represent the lowest ratings and  represent the highest ratings.
 NR denotes that the drama did not rank in the top 20 daily programs on that date.

Awards and nominations

International broadcast 
 The drama is set to air in Japan on KNTV in January 2019.
 Available in Viu and other online platforms.

Notes

References

External links
  (in Korean)
 
 
 

Korean Broadcasting System television dramas
South Korean romantic comedy television series
2018 South Korean television series debuts
2018 South Korean television series endings
Korean-language television shows
Television series by KBS Media
Television series by HB Entertainment